Anne Fortier (born 1971) is a Danish-Canadian writer who has lived in the US and Canada since 2002.

Works 

Fortier submitted her first manuscript for publication at the age of 13. Since then, she has written the novels Hyrder på bjerget (in Danish, 2005), Juliet (in English, 2010), Julie (co-written with Nina Bolt in Danish, 2013), Amazonerne's Ring (in Danish, 2013) and The Lost Sisterhood (in English, 2014).

The novel Juliet takes place in Siena (Sienna) in Italy and is based on the story of Romeo and Juliet. The novel was a New York Times Bestseller. A Juliet film is currently in production by Paramount/Montecito and director James Mangold.

Fortier also co-produced the Emmy Award–winning documentary Fire and Ice: The Winter War of Finland and Russia.

Personal life 

She was born in 1971 in Holstebro to mother Birgit Malling Eriksen.

Fortier holds a Ph.D. in the History of Ideas from Aarhus University, Denmark. During her studies she spent two terms at Corpus Christi College, Oxford as an Associate Graduate Member.

References

External links

Danish women novelists
Canadian women novelists
Living people
People from Holstebro
21st-century Canadian novelists
21st-century Canadian women writers
21st-century Danish novelists
1971 births